is the 33rd single by the Japanese idol girl group AKB48. It was released in Japan on October 30, 2013. The participating members for the title track were given English nicknames. The single reached number one on Oricon and Billboard's weekly charts.

Promotion and release
During AKB48's annual rock-paper-scissors tournament held at the Nippon Budokan area on September 18, 2013, AKB48 announced the lineup for "Heart Electric", and the release date of October 30. Haruna Kojima was announced last and come out with a red skirt in contrast to the blue skirts of the other members; this indicated that she was the center of the single. This marks Kojima's first time as a solo center. The group then performed the song  and introduced themselves with English nicknames.

The single was released in nine editions: four regular, four limited, and a theater edition. The limited editions contain a ticket for a handshake event and a randomly selected sticker of one of the 16 nicknamed girls.  The regular editions are the same as the limited editions except that they contain one of 48 photos instead of the handshake ticket. The Type-K edition has a DVD documentary about the graduation of Sayaka Akimoto.

Musical style, writing, composition 
The song was done by RoopSounds, who had previously done "Skirt, Hirari". The music is described as being like a marching band. During the performance, Kojima does a roll-call of some of the participants, each of whom has an English nickname. This was explained as being according to band protocols.

Music video
The music video for Heart Electric was directed by Shusuke Kaneko who is known for the Heisei Gamera trilogy, Godzilla, Mothra and King Ghidorah: Giant Monsters All-Out Attack, and the live-action film adaptation of Death Note. The video premiered at the group's handshake event at the Osaka Dome. It is described as girls competing for individuality in a band called "The G. Fingers". Kojima, who plays Michelle, said that "there were a lot of scenes we shot for the music video, and remembering all the nicknames for the band members was really difficult."

Track listing

Type A

Type K

Type B

Type 4

Theater

Personnel

"Heart Electric"
The title track is sung by 16 members; each girl has been given an English nickname:

 

Center : Haruna Kojima
 Team A
 Anna Iriyama - Veronica
 Minami Takahashi - Linda
 Rina Kawaei - Kawaey
 Yui Yokoyama - Mary
 Mayu Watanabe - Elizabeth

 Team K
 Yuko Oshima - Lucy

 Team B
 Yuki Kashiwagi – Catherine
 Haruna Kojima - Michelle
 Haruka Shimazaki - Angelina

 Team 4
 Minami Minegishi - Barbara

 Team S
 Jurina Matsui - Caroline

 Team E
 Rena Matsui - Sandy

 Team N
 Miyuki Watanabe - Josephine
 Sayaka Yamamoto - Rosanna

 Team H
 Aika Oota - Margaret
 Rino Sashihara - Laura

"Kaisoku to Doutai Shiryoku"
The song is performed by Under Girls.

Centers: Rena Kato, Akari Suda.

 Team A: Karen Iwata, Ayaka Kikuchi, Sumire Sato, Juri Takahashi
 Team K: Rie Kitahara, Asuka Kuramochi, Tomu Muto
 Team B: Miori Ichikawa, Ayaka Umeda, Mina Oba, Rena Kato
 SKE48 Team S: Yuria Kizaki
 SKE 48 Team KII: Akane Takayanagi, Akari Suda
 SKE48 Team E: Kanon Kimoto, Nao Furuhata
 NMB48 Team M: Fuuko Yagura
 HKT48 Team H: Haruka Kodama, Sakura Miyawaki
 JKT48 Team J/ AKB48 Team B: Aki Takajo

"Kimi Dake ni Chu! Chu! Chu!"
Performed by Tentoumu Chu! (てんとうむChu!): 

Center: Mako Kojima
 Team 4: Nana Okada, Mako Kojima, Miki Nishino
 SKE48 Kenkyuusei: Ryoha Kitagawa
 NMB48 Kenkyuusei: Nagisa Shibuya
 HKT48 Kenkyuusei: Meru Tashima, Mio Tomonaga

""Kiss made Countdown"
Performed by Team A: 

Center: Mayu Watanabe

Team A: Rina Izuta, Anna Iriyama, Karen Iwata, Ryoka Oshima, Rina Kawaei, Ayaka Kikuchi, Haruka Kodama, Marina Kobayashi , Yukari Sasaki, Sato Sumire, Mariya Suzuki, Juri Takahashi, Minami Takahashi, Yuuka Tano, Matsui Sakiko, Ayaka Morikawa, Fuuko Yagura, Yui Yokoyama, Mayu Watanabe

"Sasameyuki Regret"
Performed by Team K: 

Centers: Yuko Oshima, Jurina Matsui

Team K:Maria Abe, Mayumi Uchida, Yuko Oshima, Rie Kitahara, Asuka Kuramochi, Kana Kobayashi, Amina Sato, Haruka Shimada, Shihori Suzuki, Rina Chikano, Chisato Nakata, Mariya Nagao, Rena Nozawa, Rina Hirata, Nana Fujita, Nao Furuhata, Ami Maeda, Jurina Matsui, Miho Miyazaki, Tomu Muto
Team 4: Moe Aigasa
Kenkyuusei: Ami Yumoto

Note: Moe Aigasa and Ami Yumoto were chosen from a special audition among the 13th, 14th, and 15th generation members in Team 4 and Kenkyuusei, as documented in the Type-4 DVD. They auditioned for Sayaka Akimoto and Tomomi Itano, 2 Team K members who were graduating from AKB48 in 2013. Finally, The winner was announced with Aigasa picked by Akimoto and Yumoto picked by Itano.

"Tiny T-shirt"
Performed by Team B: 

Center: Yuki Kashiwagi

Team B: Haruka Ishida, Miori Ichikawa, Misaki Iwasa, Ayaka Umeda, Mina Oba, Miyuu Omori,  Shizuka Oya, Yuki Kashiwagi, Haruka Katayama, Rena Kato, Natsuki Kojima, Haruna Kojima, Haruka Shimazaki, Aki Takajo, Miyu Takeuchi, Miku Tanabe, Mariko Nakamura, Wakana Natori, Misato Nonaka, Reina Fujie, Suzuran Yamauchi, Miyuki Watanabe

"Seijun Philosophy"
Performed by Team 4: 

Center: Mako Kojima
Team 4: Moe Aigasa, Saho Iwatate, Natsuki Uchiyama, Ayano Umeta, Ayaka Okada, Nana Okada, Saki Kitazawa, Mako Kojima, Shinozaki Ayana, Takashima Yurina, Nishino Miki, Hashimoto Hikari, Maeda Mitsuki, Minegishi Minami, Murayama Yuiri, Mogi Shinobu

"Kimi no Hitomi wa Planetarium"
Kenkyuusei (研究生) Center: Nana Owada

Kenkyuusei: Ichikawa Manami, Owada Nana, Haruka Komiyama, Sato Kiara, Tsuchiyasu Mizuki, Fukuoka Seina, Mion Mukaichi, Yumoto Ami

Charts

Billboard charts

Oricon charts

G-music (Taiwan)

Year-end charts

Release history

SNH48 version

"Heart Electric" (Chinese: 心电感应, Pinyin: Xīndiàn gǎnyìng) was redone in Mandarin for AKB48's sister group in China, SNH48, as the group's fourth single. It was available for ordering on March 12 in the SNH48 official online store.

Notes

References 
 Release information

 Other references

External links 

2013 singles
AKB48 songs
Songs with lyrics by Yasushi Akimoto
King Records (Japan) singles
2013 songs